James Houlihan is an American politician who served as Cook County assessor from 1997 to 2010 and as an Illinois state representative from 1973 to 1979.

Early life
Houlihan was born in 1942 or 1943. Houlihan was born and raised in the 19th Ward of Chicago on the far southwest side of Chicago.

Career
Houlihan was a protégé of Thomas Hynes, the Cook County assessor and 19th Ward boss.

In the 1970s he was an independent-minded Illinois state representative, elected from a district located on the northern Chicago lakefront. He had ties to prominent lakefront liberals. He was elected in 1972, and reelected in 1974. However, in 1978, he was unseated in the Democratic primary.

He served as a top aide to Chicago mayor Harold Washington. He then became a deputy assessor in Thomas Hynes' Cook County assessor office

Cook County Assessor
In March 1997, Thomas Hynes resigned from office after serving for 18 years as Cook County assessor. Houlihan was appointed by the Cook County Board of Commissioners to fill the office. Houlihan's appointment was championed by Hynes himself. Houlihan would be reelected in 1998, 2002, and 2006. He opted not run for reelection in 2010.

At the time he took office, residential properties were undervalued. Rather than remedying this, which would have led to higher taxes for many, and would be unpopular, he kept the rates artificially low, and even began to lower the rates for commercial and industrial properties. Houlihan so skewed residential values to artificially low values, that it uncalibrated the county's property tax system so severely that it may have been in violation of the Constitution of Illinois.

Houlihan, over his tenure, defied legal requirements and operated outside of professional standards.

During his tenure as assessor, Houlihan held a rivalry with Cook County Board of Review member Joseph Berrios. In 2006, behind-the-scenes, Houlihan gave his support to Brendan Houlihan (of no relation) in his effort to unseat Maureen Murphy in the Cook County Board of Review 1st district, which was successful. Murphy had been an ally on the board of Joseph Berrios.

In 2007, Houlihan spoke out against Michael Madigan's plan to cap property tax assessments, arguing that, compared to the stalled legislation supported by Houlihan, Madigan's legislation would save Chicago Loop skyscraper owners who were represented by Madigan's own law firm hundreds of thousands of dollars than they would owe under Houlihan's plan.

In 2010, he accused Joseph Berrios and Michael Madigan of hiding information from taxpayers that could affect the November general election.

In 2010, Houlihan said that he was considering running for mayor of Chicago in 2011. He ultimately did not run.

Later career
After leaving office, Houlihan went on to become a state lobbyist.

Houlihan served on the Commission on Chicago Landmarks. His tenure on the commission ended in 2019.

Electoral history

Illinois State Representative
1972

1974

1978

Cook County Assessor
1998

2002

2006

References

Cook County Assessors
Politicians from Chicago
Democratic Party members of the Illinois House of Representatives
1940s births
Living people